John Thomas "Trey" Lamar III (born August 5, 1980) is an American lawyer and Republican politician. He is a current member of the Mississippi House of Representatives, having represented Mississippi's 8th House district, which composes parts of Tate and Lafayette Counties, in the House since 2012.

Biography 
John Thomas Lamar III was born on August 5, 1980, in Senatobia, Mississippi. He attended Magnolia Heights School in Senatobia. He has graduated from the University of Mississippi, the Mississippi College School of Law, and Washington University in St. Louis. He has represented Mississippi's 8th House district, composed of parts of Tate and Lafayette Counties, in the Mississippi House of Representatives as a Republican since 2012. In the current (2020-2024) session, Lamar is the chairman of the House's Ways and Means committee.

References 

1980 births
Living people
Republican Party members of the Mississippi House of Representatives
People from Senatobia, Mississippi
21st-century American politicians
American lawyers
University of Mississippi alumni
Mississippi College School of Law alumni
Washington University in St. Louis alumni